Captain Kit Dalton --- (23 January 1843 – 3 April 1920).

"He fought for the Confederacy and with Quantrill's Raiders.  After the war, he rode with Jesse & Frank James and Cole Younger over 100 years ago.  A$50,000 reward was offered for him dead or alive; since they could not capture him, he was later pardoned by several governors with his promise that he would lead an exemplary life, which he did during his last 20 years, in Memphis."

Kit Dalton is buried at Elmwood Cemetery, in the section known as Confederate's Rest.

References

1843 births
1920 deaths
American bank robbers
Gunslingers of the American Old West
James–Younger Gang
Place of birth missing
Place of death missing